Abavorana luctuosa, also known as the Malaysian frog, mahogany frog or purple frog, is a species of true frog. It is found in the Malay Peninsula (Malaysia and southernmost Thailand) and in Borneo (Indonesia, Malaysia). It was formerly placed in the genus Hylarana.

Abavorana  luctuosa is a leaf-litter frog from lowland and submontane primary rainforests, including somewhat disturbed habitats. Adult frogs disperse widely through the forest and breed in rain pools.

It is reddish to chocolate brown, bordered by a narrow cream dorsolateral line on each side, beginning at the tip of the snout to above the vent.

References

Che, Pang, Zhao, Wu, Zhao, and Zhang, 2007, Mol. Phylogenet. Evol., 43: 1–13.
Deckert, 1938, Sitzungsber. Ges. Naturforsch. Freunde Berlin, 1938: 144.
Frank and Ramus, 1995, Compl. Guide Scient. Common Names Amph. Rept. World: 108

External links
Amphibian and Reptiles of Peninsular Malaysia - Hylarana luctuosa

luctuosa
Amphibians of Indonesia
Amphibians of Malaysia
Amphibians of Thailand
Amphibians of Borneo
Amphibians described in 1871
Taxa named by Wilhelm Peters
Taxobox binomials not recognized by IUCN